Robert Ho may refer to:

 Robert Hotung, Hong Kong businessman and philanthropist 
 Robert Ho (sailor), Singaporean sailor